Jarle Vespestad (born 16 April 1966) is a Norwegian jazz musician (percussion), the younger brother of jazz musician Liz Tove Vespestad, and a central member of Tord Gustavsen's projects.

Career 

Vespestad was born in Kirkenes and picked up drumming in the local marching band, but drumming first became serious after finishing high school, where he found himself heading into a future as a substitute teacher at his local high-school. He made up his mind and graduated from the Toneheim Folk High School (1988) and Jazz program at Trondheim Musikkonservatorium (1990). In Trondheim he became the driving force behind many successful bands to come out of Trondheim the following years, like Veslefrekk, "Trondheim Kunstorkester", Farmers Market (1991–) and the Maria Kannegaard trio (1993–). In addition he was drummer with the Embla Nordic in Copenhagen.

In Oslo Vespestad has worked with different groups since 1996, releasing albums with Sigurd Køhn (More Pepper please) and Anders Jormin (Once) in 1996. He also cooperated with Silje Nergaard, Supersilent and Tord Gustavsen. He released the duo album Orbit (1998) and toured with Gustavsen's trio. For more than two decades he has been a leading drummer on the Norwegian jazz scene, within bands like Supersilent, Petter Wettre Trio and Quartet and Håvard Wiik Trio, in addition to Tord Gustavsen Trio, Silje Nergaard, Embla Nordic and Veslefrekk.

Discography (in selection)

Solo albums 
1998: Orbit (Curling Legs)

Collaborations 
With Silje Nergaard
1990: Tell Me Where You're Going (EMI Records)
1991: Silje (Princess Records)
1993: Cow on the Highway (Sonet Records)
1995: Brevet (Kirkelig Kulturverksted)
1996: Hjemmefra – From Home (Kirkelig Kulturverksted)
2000: Port of Call (EmArcy)
2001: At First Light (EmArcy)
2003: Nightwatch (Universal Music)
2005: Be Still My Heart – The Essential (EmArcy), compilation
2005: Live in Koln (EmArcy)
2007: Darkness Out of Blue (EmArcy)
2009: A Thousand True Stories (Columbia Records)
2010: If I Could Wrap Up a Kiss (Sony Music)
2012: Unclouded (Columbia Records)

With Farmers Market
1995: Speed/Balkan/Boogie (Kirkelig Kulturverksted)
1997: Musikk fra Hybridene (Music from the Hybrids) (Kirkelig Kulturverksted)
2000: Farmers Market (Winter & Winter)
2008: Surfin' USSR''' (Ipecac Recordings)
2012: Slav to the Rhythm (Division Records)

With Sigurd Køhn
1998: More Pepper please (Real Records)
1999: Woman's Got To Have It (Real Records)
2003: Angels (Real Records)

With Tord Gustavsen
2003: Changing Places (ECM)
2005: The Ground (ECM)
2007: Being There (ECM)
2012: The Well (ECM)
2014: Extended Circle (ECM)
2016: What Was Said (ECM)
2018: The Other Side (ECM)

With Roy Powell and Terje Gewelt
2003: Solace (Nagel Heyer Records)

With Jacob Young & Roy Powell
2011: Anthem'' (PVY Records)

References

External links 
Jarle Vespestad Biography at Tord Gustavsen Official Website

1966 births
Living people
20th-century Norwegian drummers
21st-century Norwegian drummers
Norwegian jazz drummers
Male drummers
Norwegian jazz composers
Norwegian University of Science and Technology alumni
People from Jessheim
ECM Records artists
20th-century drummers
Male jazz composers
20th-century Norwegian male musicians
21st-century Norwegian male musicians
Supersilent members
Farmers Market (band) members
Veslefrekk members
Tord Gustavsen Ensemble members
People from Sør-Varanger